There are 32 Cabinet ministers and 50 Ministers of State in the Cabinet of Uganda (2021 to 2026). 

According to Section 111 of the 1995 Constitution of Uganda, as amended in 2005, "There shall be a Cabinet which shall consist of the President, the Vice President, the Prime Minister and such number of Ministers as may appear to the President to be reasonably necessary for the efficient running of the State."

Cabinet ministers

Below is a list of members of the Ugandan cabinet as of 9 June 2021.

Ministers of state

Below is a list of the  Ministers of State of Uganda:

See also
 Parliament of Uganda
 Politics of Uganda
 List of presidents of Uganda

References

Main|
Uganda
Government ministers
Uganda,cabinet

fr:Politique de l'Ouganda